Willie Clarence Hall (born August 8, 1950) is an American drummer best known for his work with Isaac Hayes and as a member of the Blues Brothers band.

Biography
Hall began his career as a drummer in 1965, while still in high school. He played with the Bar-Kays and Isaac Hayes' band The Movement. In the seventies, as part of the Stax-Volt Recording Section Team from 1968 to 1977, Hall backed dozens of major Stax artists on recordings, including  The Emotions, Little Milton, Carla and Rufus Thomas, Johnnie Taylor, The Staple Singers, Albert King and Isaac Hayes. Hall produced Hayes' last Stax album, and did percussion on Hayes' albums Hot Buttered Soul and The Isaac Hayes Movement, as well as his Theme from Shaft.

In 1977 Hall was invited to replace drummer Al Jackson, Jr. of Booker T. & the MGs after Jackson died in 1975. Hall recorded the album Universal Language with the group before it officially disbanded. Two years later Hall, along with guitarist Steve "The Colonel" Cropper and bass player Donald "Duck" Dunn became a member of The Blues Brothers, which led to his appearance in the hit movie The Blues Brothers and its sequel Blues Brothers 2000. He also appeared as himself in the 2008 movie Soul Men.

Hall has toured the world and recorded with a variety of artists, including The Blues Brothers, Steve Cropper, Cab Calloway, Aretha Franklin, Ray Charles, KC and the Sunshine Band, Bonnie Raitt, Earl Scruggs, Charlie Daniels Band, Todd Rundgren and Roger McGuinn, among others. He was also a member of The Bo-Keys, a band of highly respected Memphis musicians, including Isaac Hayes' wah-wah guitarist, Charles "Skip" Pitts.

Hall is the father of rapper Gangsta Pat.

Collaborations 
With Rufus Thomas
 Do the Funky Chicken (Stax Records, 1970)
 Crown Prince of Dance (Stax Records, 1973)

With Tony Joe White
 Eyes (20th Century Records, 1976)

With Linda Clifford
 I'm Yours (RSO Records, 1980)

With Booker T. & the M.G.'s
 Universal Language (Asylum Records, 1977)

With Cate Brothers
 In One Eye and Out the Order (Asylum Records, 1976)

With Albert King
 Blues for Elvis – King Does the King's Things (Stax Records, 1970)
 The Blues Don't Change (Stax Records, 1974)

With Jerry Butler
 The Love We Have, The Love We Had (Mercury Records, 1973)

With Al Green
 Soul Survivor (A&M Records, 1987)

With The Manhattan Transfer
 Pastiche (Atlantic Records, 1978)

With David Porter
 Victim of the Joke? An Opera (Enterprise Records, 1971)
 Sweat & Love (Enterprise Records, 1973)

With Keith Sykes
 The Way That I Feel (Midland Records, 1977)

With Mavis Staples
 Mavis Staples (Volt Records, 1969)
 Only for the Lonely (Volt Records, 1970)

With Steve Cropper
 Playin' My Thang (MCA Records, 1981)

With Levon Helm
 Levon Helm (ABC Records, 1978)

With Yvonne Elliman
 Rising Sun (RSO Records, 1975)

With Shirley Brown
 Shirley Brown (Arista Records, 1977)
 Intimate Storm (Soundtown Records, 1984)

References

External links

Willie Hall interview on Radio Memphis

1950 births
Musicians from Memphis, Tennessee
African-American drummers
African-American male actors
African-American record producers
American funk drummers
American male drummers
American male film actors
American session musicians
Living people
Record producers from Tennessee
Singers from Tennessee
The Blues Brothers members
Booker T. & the M.G.'s members
The Bar-Kays members
American blues drummers
20th-century American drummers
African-American male singers